Andriy Yuriyovych Kitela (born 13 December 2004) is a Ukrainian professional footballer who plays as a right-back for Rukh Lviv.

Club career

Early years
Born in Stryi, Kitela began his career in the academy from his native city, where his first coaches were Vasyl Bahrych and Vitaliy Ponomaryov. Then he continued in the Karpaty Lviv and the Rukh Lviv academies.

Rukh Lviv
In September 2020 he signed a contract with the Ukrainian Premier League side Rukh Lviv. He made his debut in the Ukrainian Premier League on 19 October 2022 in an away match against Vorskla Poltava.

References

External links
 
 

2004 births
Living people
People from Stryi
Ukrainian footballers
Ukraine youth international footballers
Association football defenders
FC Rukh Lviv players
Ukrainian Premier League players
Sportspeople from Lviv Oblast